The Historical Railways Estate (HRE) is a group of over 3,200 structures—predominantly bridges, but also including tunnels, embankments, and other works—associated with former railways in the United Kingdom. The structures are owned by the Department for Transport (DfT) and managed by National Highways (NH). Controversially, NH has proposed to demolish or infill dozens of bridges.

Background

The railways came into public ownership as a result of the Transport Act 1947. When they were privatised in 1997, operational infrastructure became the responsibility of Railtrack and then Network Rail. The Historical Railways Estate (formerly known as the Closed-line Estate and the Burdensome Estate) is the land and infrastructure associated with closed lines. This transferred to BRB (Residuary) Limited, which was dissolved in 2013, and the HRE was transferred to the Highways Agency, which later became Highways England (HE) and then National Highways (NH).

NH states that the HRE comprises 2,055 bridges, 152 tunnels, 93 viaducts and aqueducts, 643 partially dismantled structures, 181 earthworks, and 106 other sites. The miscellaneous sites include plots of land, former roads, and monuments or memorials built by railway companies. The vast majority of the structures, 2,243, are in England; 608 are in Scotland, and 379 are in Wales; 77 of the structures are listed buildings.

Many structures that were once part of the HRE have been transferred to other organisations to be repurposed, often as part of cycling and walking routes. One such structure is Bennerley Viaduct, now owned by Railway Paths Ltd.

Restorations
NH is funded only to maintain the structures in a safe condition, but has worked with other organisations to restore and repurpose some. Examples include Castlefield Viaduct in Manchester, which the National Trust is converting into an elevated park, inspired by the High Line in New York City.

Demolitions and infillings
Between 2013-2021, the Highways Agency/Highways England infilled 51 structures at a cost of £8.01M  and, in January 2021, it was revealed that the company had plans to demolish or infill a further 134 bridges and tunnels. This provoked opposition on the grounds that many of the structures had some potential to be repurposed for railway reopening schemes or active travel routes. No evaluation was made of their heritage or environmental value. Campaigners claimed that the proposed action was disproportionate as most of the condemned structures presented no significant risks and, in many cases, appropriate maintenance would cost a fraction of the infilling or demolition work. Among the structures was Queensbury Tunnel in West Yorkshire which had already been partially infilled and which Highways England proposed to abandon despite local plans to incorporate it into the proposed Bradford-Halifax Greenway.

The issue came to a head in May/June 2021 when a bridge carrying the B6259 road over the dismantled Eden Valley Railway, close to Musgrave railway station, was infilled with more than 1,600 tonnes of aggregate and concrete.

The structure spanned a five-mile section of trackbed which local rail enthusiasts hoped to restore, linking the Eden Valley and Stainmore railways to create an 11-mile tourist line between Appleby and Kirkby Stephen. Highways England claimed to have consulted both railways prior to the work taking place, but this was denied by the two organisations who wrote a letter of complaint to Nick Harris, the company’s Acting Chief Executive. The action provoked a public outcry. Lord Faulkner, vice chair of the All-Party Parliamentary Group on Industrial Heritage, raised the matter in the House of Lords, describing it as "cultural vandalism". Highways England was required to apply for retrospective planning permission for the infilling works, to which Eden District Council received 911 objections and two expressions of support. Advised by planning officers to reject the application, the council's planning committee unanimously refused retrospective planning permission on 16 June 2022. Restoration of Great Musgrave bridge to its former condition, together with additional strengthening, could cost an estimated £431,000, in addition to the £124,000 spent on the initial infilling work. National Highways agreed to abide by an enforcement notice issued by Eden District Council which requires the infill to be removed and the surrounding landscape restored to its condition prior to the infilling works. This notice became effective on 11 October 2022 and the work must be completed within 12 months of this date.

The backlash against the Great Musgrave infill scheme became national news and, in July 2021, the government intervened to pause infilling and demolition schemes at dozens of other railway bridges across the country. Many civil engineers expressed shame and embarrassment at the negative impact on their professional reputation.

The DfT commissioned a review from the walking and cycling charity Sustrans, which was published in March 2022 and identified viable reuses for two thirds of the structures affected as part of the National Cycle Network or in local schemes.

National Highways has developed a new way to determine the nature of major works to the disused railway structures it manages; proposals will be reviewed by the company's Stakeholder Advisory Forum which includes representatives from the Department for Transport, Sustrans, Railway Paths Ltd, the Railway Heritage Trust, the HRE Group, the Heritage Railway Association, Natural England, Historic England (also representing Cadw), Historic Scotland and ADEPT.

References

Department for Transport
Rail infrastructure in the United Kingdom